Clytie illunaris is a moth of the family Erebidae first described by Jacob Hübner in 1813. It is found in France, Spain, North Africa and the Arabian Peninsula.

Technical description and variation

Clytie illunaris Hbn. (= gracilis B.-Haas.) (62 b). Forewing grey, or dark ash grey, or, more rarely, pale bone colour; inner and outer lines blackish, very seldom clear, often interrupted, or even altogether absent; submarginal line pale, only visible in the dark grey examples, always preceded by a black irregularly zigzag line, not reaching costa but blackest below it; orbicular stigma a faint dark dot; reniform a pale figure of 8, often divided into two spots; hindwing pale grey or bone colour, with a broad diffuse grey submarginal band, always darker and better defined in the female; the pale bone colour forms may be separated as ab. ossea ab. nov. (= ab. 2 Hmps.) (62 b); in ab. brunnea ab. nov. (= ab. 1 Hmps.) the ground colour of forewing is brown, the markings equally obsolete; while in ab. obscura ab. nov. (= ab. 3 Hmps.) the forewing, except at base of inner margin, is suffused with red brown, the subterminal line alone being visible.

Subspecies
Clytie illunaris illunaris
Clytie illunaris legraini

Biology
There are multiple generations per year.

The larvae feed on Tamarix species, including Tamarix gallica.

References

External links

Lepiforum e.V.

Ophiusina
Moths described in 1813
Moths of Europe
Moths of Africa
Moths of the Middle East
Taxa named by Jacob Hübner